Arnoldy Nunatak is one of the Sky-Hi Nunataks lying  south of Mount Cahill. It was named by the Advisory Committee on Antarctic Names in 1987 after Roger L. Arnoldy, a physicist at the University of New Hampshire in Durham, New Hampshire.  He was a United States Antarctic Research Program Principal Investigator in upper atmospheric physics at Siple Station and South Pole Station for many years from 1973.

References 

Nunataks of Palmer Land